The women's 1500 metres at the 2012 World Junior Championships in Athletics will be held at the Estadi Olímpic Lluís Companys on 13 and 15 July.

Medalists

Records
, the existing world junior and championship records were as follows.

Results

Heats

Qualification: The first 3 of each heat (Q) and the 3 fastest times (q) qualified

Final

Participation
According to an unofficial count, 37 athletes from 28 countries participated in the event.

References

External links
WJC12 1500 metres schedule

1500 metres
1500 metres at the World Athletics U20 Championships
2012 in women's athletics